Río Grande is a municipality in the Mexican state of Zacatecas.

Geography
The municipality of Río Grande is located in northern Zacatecas. It borders the municipalities of Miguel Auza, Juan Aldama, and General Francisco R. Murguía to the north, Villa de Cos to the east, Cañitas de Felipe Pescador to the southeast, Fresnillo and Saín Alto to the south, and Sombrerete to the west.

Over 96% of the municipality's area lies in the drainage basin of the Aguanaval River, the main watercourse in the area which flows south to north through the municipality. This river was known as the Río Grande in the 16th and 17th centuries despite its modest size.

Average annual precipitation ranges between 300 and 600 millimetres.

History
Oral history holds that a Spanish settlement was founded at Río Grande on 18 August 1562. The town was recognized by the Royal Audiencia of Guadalajara on March 5, 1689 under the name Santa Elena de Río Grande.

Río Grande was first incorporated as an ayuntamiento in the partido of Nieves in Zacatecas on 29 October 1833. It became a free municipality on 19 August 1916.

Administration
The municipal government comprises a president, a councillor (Spanish: síndico), and fourteen trustees (regidores), eight elected by relative majority and six by proportional representation. The current president of the municipality is Julio César Ramírez López.

Demographics
In the 2010 Mexican Census, the municipality of Río Grande recorded a population of 62,693 inhabitants living in 15,628 households. It recorded a population of 63,880 inhabitants in the 2015 Intercensal Survey. 

There are 58 localities in the municipality, two of which are classified as urban:
Río Grande, the municipal seat located on the Aguanaval River, which recorded a population of 32,944 inhabitants in the 2010 Census; and
Loreto, a suburb of the municipal seat located to its northeast, which had 2637 inhabitants in 2010.

Economy
The main economic activity in Río Grande is agriculture. Beans are its main crop; the municipality is located in the middle of Mexico's main bean-producing region. The gross domestic product of the municipality was unofficially estimated at 2655.8 million Mexican pesos in 2010.

References

Municipalities of Zacatecas
1833 establishments in Mexico
States and territories established in 1833